CFU-DL is a colony forming unit that gives rise to Langerhans cells.

References

Colony forming units
Blood cells